The Samson Cree Nation, also known as the Samson First Nation, is one of four band governments in the area of Maskwacis, Alberta, Canada.

Indian Reserves
Three Indian Reserves are governed by the band:
Samson Indian Reserve No. 137
Samson Indian Reserve No. 137A
Pigeon Lake 138A
Pigeon Lake IR No. 138A is shared with the Louis Bull First Nation, the Montana First Nation and the Ermineskin Cree Nation

References

External links
Official Samson Cree Nation Website

First Nations governments in Alberta
Cree governments